Homerville is a city in Clinch County, Georgia, United States. Its population was 2,456 at the 2010 census, a decrease of 12.38% from 2,803 in 2000. It is the county seat of Clinch County. It was incorporated February 15, 1869.

History

Clinch County was created on February 14, 1850, by an act of the Georgia General Assembly, and was named for General Duncan Lamont Clinch, a decorated United States brigadier general and Georgia congressman who had recently died. Clinch, Georgia's 95th county, was formed from land originally inhabited by the Oconee people and consolidated portions of Ware County and Lowndes County. The act creating the county named Elijah Mattox, Simon W. Nichol, Timothy Kirkland, Benjamin Sirmans, and John J. Johnson as commissioners charged with selecting a county seat and constructing a courthouse.

The designated commissioners quickly settled on a site just southwest of the present-day Homerville, and in memory of President James K. Polk decided to name the county seat "Polk". Two years later, however, the Georgia General Assembly inexplicably changed the name of the county seat to "Magnolia", just as the county's first courthouse was completed. The first courthouse was quite small and was destroyed in 1856 when a citizen, presumably dissatisfied with legal proceedings brought against him, decided to destroy the courthouse by fire.

In February 1853, Dr. John Homer Mattox and his family moved from their former home on the Suwannee River and settled on a tract of land adjacent to the Magnolia stage route. In recognition of his family name, he called the settlement Homersville. Shortly thereafter the Atlantic and Gulf Railroad expansion replaced the stage route, and Mattox's settlement was simply known as "Station No.11".

Over time the settlement grew, and in 1860 approximately 275 citizens of Clinch County petitioned the Georgia General Assembly to move the county seat from the nearby Magnolia to Mattox's settlement. Later the same year, the legislature relented and officially named Station No. 11 the county seat of Clinch County. By 1863, the town of Homersville was known as Forest. It would take approximately nine more years for the legislature to officially recognize the name Homerville and incorporate the city; however, Homerville shows up as the name of the county seat in newspapers by March 1864.

Dr. John Homer Mattox's original dwelling is now the home of the Clinch County Chamber of Commerce and Welcome Center. The home recently underwent an extensive restoration that not only restored many of the rooms to their former glory but also added modern plumbing and central heat and air for the convenience of visitors. The structure now holds the administrative offices of the chamber and a museum dedicated to the early days of Clinch County.

Geography
Homerville is located in north-central Clinch County at  (31.036832, -82.751302). U.S. Routes 84 and 441 cross in the center of town. US 84 leads east  to Waycross and west  to Valdosta, while US 441 leads north  to Douglas, Georgia, and south  to Lake City, Florida.

Wooded areas and swampy marshes surround the city.

Climate

Demographics

2020 census

As of the 2020 United States census, there were 2,344 people, 983 households, and 610 families residing in the city.

2000 census
As of the census of 2000, there were 2,803 people, 1,045 households, and 671 families residing in the city. The racial makeup of the city was 58.62% White, 40.03% African American, 0.14% Native American, 0.11% Asian, 0.04% from other races, and 1.07% from two or more races. Hispanic or Latino of any race were 0.61% of the population.

There were 1,045 households, out of which 31.2% had children under the age of 18 living with them, 40.1% were married couples living together, 20.2% had a female householder with no husband present, and 35.7% were non-families. 31.5% of all households were made up of individuals, and 13.0% had someone living alone who was 65 years of age or older.  The average household size was 2.40 and the average family size was 3.02.

In the city, the population was spread out, with 25.4% under the age of 18, 8.5% from 18 to 24, 29.0% from 25 to 44, 21.9% from 45 to 64, and 15.3% who were 65 years of age or older.  The median age was 37 years. For every 100 females, there were 97.8 males.  For every 100 females age 18 and over, there were 101.2 males.

The median income for a household in the city was $17,500, and the median income for a family was $26,058. Males had a median income of $23,788 versus $18,833 for females. The per capita income for the city was $12,176.  About 32.1% of families and 33.4% of the population were below the poverty line, including 40.3% of those under age 18 and 30.9% of those age 65 or over.

Education

Clinch County School District 
The Clinch County School District holds pre-school to grade twelve, and consists of a headstart, elementary/middle school, and a high school.

The district has 96 full-time teachers and over 1,499 students.
Clinch County Elementary School
Clinch County Middle School
Clinch County High School

References

Cities in Georgia (U.S. state)
Cities in Clinch County, Georgia
County seats in Georgia (U.S. state)